The Ansorge's ridged frog (Ptychadena ansorgii) is a species of frog in the family Ptychadenidae. It is found in Angola, Democratic Republic of the Congo, Malawi, Zambia, possibly Mozambique, and possibly Tanzania. Its natural habitats are subtropical or tropical dry forest, subtropical or tropical moist lowland forest, moist savanna, rivers, and swamps.

References

Ptychadena
Taxonomy articles created by Polbot
Amphibians described in 1905